Rexhai Surroi (Serbian: Реџаји Суроји, Redžaji Suroji) (8 June 1929 — 22 December 1988) was a Yugoslav Albanian journalist, diplomat and writer. 

He was a member of the first cohort of students to have finished high school in Albanian in the former Yugoslavia in 1947/48. He graduated from the University of Belgrade's Law School.  He was also one of the few Kosovo Albanians to become ambassadors of Yugoslavia.  He was the father of Veton and Flaka Surroi.

He was an active football player before becoming journalist and editor of weekly "Zani i Rinis".  He was an editor in Radio Pristina, where he became director in the mid-sixties.  In 1969/70, he served as vice-president of the provincial government of SAP Kosovo, he was one of the most fervent advocates for the establishment of the University of Pristina, the only in Yugoslavia where the medium of instruction was Albanian.  In 1971, he was appointed ambassador of Yugoslavia to Bolivia and from 1974-1977 he held the post of assistant secretary in the Federal Secretariat of Foreign Affairs.  From 1977 to 1981, he lived in Mexico City where he was the Yugoslav ambassador to Mexico, Honduras and Costa Rica, and from 1981 to 1983 again he held the post of the assistant secretary in the Federal Secretariat of Foreign Affairs.  From 1983 to 1985 he was the general manager of the largest Albanian media company in Kosovo Rilindja.  Next, from 1985 to 1988 he was national ambassador to Spain, where he died. 

He is the author of a number of Albanian-language works such as Besniku, Dashunija dhe urrejtja, Pranvera e tretë, and Orteku I & II.

See also  
Albanians in Kosovo

References

1929 births
1988 deaths
Kosovan politicians
University of Belgrade Faculty of Law alumni
League of Communists of Kosovo politicians
Ambassadors of Yugoslavia to Bolivia
Ambassadors of Yugoslavia to Mexico
Ambassadors of Yugoslavia to Honduras
Ambassadors of Yugoslavia to Costa Rica
Ambassadors of Yugoslavia to Spain
Yugoslav Albanians